Aurat may refer to:

Movements
 Aurat March, a women's procession walk in Pakistan
 Aurat Foundation, a women's rights organization in Delhi, India

Films
 Aurat (1940 film), an Indian film directed by Mehboob Khan
 Aurat (1953 film), a Hindi film directed by B. Verma
 Aurat (1967 film), an Indian Hindi-language film directed by S. S. Balan
 Aurat Pair Ki Juti Nahin Hai, a 1985 Indian drama film directed by B.K. Adarsh
 Aurat (1986 film), by B. R. Ishaara and starring Zeenat Aman, see Zeenat Aman filmography
 Zakhmi Aurat, a 1988 Indian Hindi movie directed by Avtar Bhogal
 Aurat Teri Yehi Kahani (1954 film), a Hindi film directed by Chaturbhuj Doshi
 Aurat Teri Yehi Kahani, a 1988 Indian Bollywood film directed by Mohanji Prasad
 Aurat Aurat Aurat, a 1996 Bollywood film directed by K. Vishwanath

Television 
 Adhoori Aurat, a 2013 Pakistani drama serial
 Aurat (TV series), a 1990s Doordarshan India TV series

Other
 Awrah, or intimate parts in Islam